Johnson Matthey Technology Review, known as Platinum Metals Review before 2014, is a quarterly, peer-reviewed scientific journal publishing reports on scientific research on the platinum group metals and related industrial developments.

History
The Platinum Metal Review journal was established in 1957 and was published by Johnson Mattley and Co. From April 1998, it was published as open access and from the July 2004 issue in electronic format only. In 2014 the name of the journal was changed to Johnson Matthey Technology Review.

Aims and scope
The journal included reviews of research, books, and academic conferences, as well as primary results in the form of brief reports. It also reviewed what it considered to be notable aspects of patents and relevant scientific literature. Occasionally articles on the history, geological occurrences, and exploitation of platinum group metals were also published.

Abstracting and indexing
Platinum Metals Review was abstracted and indexed by:
 Chemical Abstracts
 Chemical Engineering and Biotechnology Abstracts
 Compendex
 Corrosion Abstracts
 Current Contents/Physical, Chemical & Earth Sciences
 Environment Abstracts
 Metals Abstracts/METADEX
 Metal Finishing Abstracts
 Science Citation Index Expanded
 Scopus
 World Textile Abstracts

References

External links 
 

Materials science journals
Publications established in 1957
Quarterly journals
English-language journals
journals
Chemistry journals
Geology journals
Engineering journals
Metallurgical processes